Dirk Busch (born 1951 in Brunsbüttelkoog, Kreis Dithmarschen, Schleswig-Holstein, Germany) is a German professor, singer, songwriter, composer, and music producer.

He graduated from University of Cologne in sociology, economics and psychology in 1974. Earning his doctorate (dr. rer. pol.) in 1976, he became professor of sociology in the University of Bremen. In the 1980s, he left the academic career for the musical one.

Discography
This the list of LPs and single hits by Dirk Busch.

Albums
1981 Kinder Kinder
1982 Du das machen wir später
1983 Zeit zu leben
1985 Zeig doch deine Gefühle
1986 An diesem Morgen
1987 Liebeslieder und leise Töne
1988 Rückenwind 
1988 Sie beißt und kratzt
1989 Wir Kinder wollen leben
1990 Bis ans Ende der Zeit
1991 Having a good time
1992 Typisch
1993 Zwischenbilanz
1993 Wenn Du mich liebst
1994 Mal so mal anders
1996 Una storia italiana (in Italian)
1996 Keine Tricks
1997 Persönlich
1998 Coming Home
1999 Es geht doch
2001 Beziehungsweisen
2002 Seven Plus Seven
2002 Ansichtssachen
2003 Balladen pur
2005 grundlos vergnügt
2006 Gute Zeiten
2007 Nur ein kurzer Traum
2008 Live in Concert – Piano & Forte

Single hits
Du bist keine Mona Lisa
Sie beißt und kratzt
Liebst Du auch den rauhen Wind
Ich zieh den Bauch nicht mehr ein
Violinista
Du musst deinen Weg alleine gehen
Willkommen in der Traumfabrik
Bis ans Ende der Zeit
So ist sie
Das Lied vom Knöllchenschreiber
Immer nur lächeln
Wie gut, dass Du kein Model bist
Wer weiß denn heute schon was morgen passiert
Das Kuschellied
Das Leben geht weiter
Sie sagt was sie denkt
Wenn der Sommer kommt
Urlaub auf der Autobahn
Lieben und Leben
Zusammen
Ich bleib Optimist
Mir geht's gut
Musik ist tief in mir
Melinda
Nur ein kurzer Traum

References

1951 births
Living people
People from Brunsbüttel
German male singers
German songwriters
German composers
University of Cologne alumni
Academic staff of the University of Bremen